A. James Hudspeth is the F.M. Kirby Professor at Rockefeller University in New York City, where he is director of the F.M. Kirby Center for Sensory Neuroscience. His laboratory studies the physiological basis of hearing.

Early life and education 
As a teenager, James Hudspeth spent his summers working as a technician in the lab of neurophysiologist Peter Kellaway at Baylor College of Medicine. Hudspeth was expelled from high school for mixing dangerous chemicals and other mischief.

Hudspeth graduated from Harvard College in 1967, and received his master's degree from Harvard University in 1968. He enrolled in a graduate program in neurobiology to avoid being drafted into the military, but a year later the policy was changed, requiring him to enter medical school for exemption. He studied under Nobel prize winners Torsten Wiesel and David Hubel. He completed both programs and received his PhD in 1973 and MD in 1974, both from Harvard University.

He began a postdoctoral fellowship with Åke Flock at the Karolinska Institute, but left early without much success to return to Harvard Medical School.

Career 
Following his postdoctoral training, Hudspeth was a professor at Caltech from 1975 to 1983. He then moved to the UCSF School of Medicine where he was a professor from 1983 to 1989. He directed the neuroscience program at University of Texas Southwestern Medical Center from 1989 until 1995, when the department was closed. In 1995, he was recruited to the Rockefeller University.

Hudspeth has been an HHMI investigator since 1993.

Research 
Hudspeth's research is focused on sensorineural hearing loss, and the deterioration of the hair cells, the sensory cells of the cochlea. Hudspeth's bold interpretation of the data obtained in his careful experimental research combined with biophysical modelling lead him to propose for the first time that the sense of hearing depends on a channel that is opened by mechanical force: The hair cells located in the inner ear perceive sound when their apical end -consisting of a bundle of filaments- bends in response to the movement caused by this sound. The activated hair cell rapidly fills with calcium entering from the outside of the cell, which in turn activates the release of neurotransmitters that start a signal to the brain.  Hudspeth proposed the existence of a "gating spring" opened by direct mechanical force that would open an hypothetical channel responsible for the entry of calcium ions. The hypothesis was based on the following evidence: 1) Part of the energy needed to bend the filament bundle was mysteriously lost, but could be explained if it was used to opening this gating spring, 2) The entry of calcium ions was microseconds long, this is so fast that only direct opening -without a cascade of chemical reactions- could account for it and 3) Hudspeth tested a model analogue to the opening of a door with a string attached to the door knob and demonstrated that a similar process was taking place when the filaments of the hair cell moved. Furthermore, microscopic evidence showed the existence of such a string-like structure tethering the tip of one filament to the side of and adjacent filament that could be the elusive gating spring; this string—called the tip link—would tense if the filament bundle was bend and then open the channel. Although the precise identity of the proteins forming the tip link and the mechanosensitive channel is still controversial 30 years later. Hudspeth's hypothesis was correct and fundamental for the understanding of the sense of hearing.

Noted publications 

Holton T & A.J. Hudspeth  A Micromechanical contribution to cochlear tuning and tonotopic organization. Science (1983); 222 (4623): 508–510
D.P. Corey, A.J. Hudspeth  Kinetics of the receptor current in bullfrog saccular hair cells. J. Neurosci., 3 (1983): 962-976
Rosenblatt KP, Sun ZP, Heller S, A.J. Hudspeth  Distribution of Ca2+-activated K+ channel isoforms along the tonotopic gradient of the chicken's cochlea. Neuron (1997): 19(5): 1061–1075 (note: this research was continued several years later taking advantage of newly available technology)
A.J. Hudspeth  How hearing happens. NEURON (1997): 19(5): 947-950
Lopez-Schier H, Starr CJ, Kappler JA, Kollmar R, A.J. Hudspeth  Directional cell migration establishes the axes of planar polarity in the posterior lateral-line organ of the zebrafish.  Dev CELL (2004): 7(3):401–412
Chan DK, A.J. Hudspeth   Ca2+ current-driven nonlinear amplification by the mammalian cochlea in vitro.  Nature Neuro (2005): 8(2):149–155
Kozlov AS, Risler T, A.J. Hudspeth  Coherent motion of stereocilia assures the concerted gating of hair-cell transduction channels. Nature Neuro (2007): 10(1):87–92
Kozlov AS, Baumgart J, Risler T, Versteegh CP, A.J. Hudspeth  Forces between clustered stereocilia minimize friction in the ear on a subnanometre scale. Nature. (2011): 474 (7351):376–9
Fisher JA, Nin F, Reichenbach T, Uthaiah RC, A.J. Hudspeth  The spatial pattern of cochlear amplification Neuron (2012): 76(5):989–9

Awards 
 1985 W. Alden Spencer Award
 1991 K.S. Cole Award, Biophysical Society
 1994 Charles A. Dana Award
 1996 Rosenstiel Award
 2002 Award of Merit, Association for Research in OtolaryngologyForces between clustered stereocilia minimize friction in the ear on a subnanometre scale. Kozlov AS, Baumgart J, Risler T, Versteegh CP, A.J. Hudspeth.  Nature. 2011 May 22;474(7351):376-9. doi: 10.1038/nature10073.
 2003 Ralph W. Gerard Prize, Society for Neuroscience
 2010 Guyot Prize, University of Groningen
 Elected member of the National Academy of Sciences and the American Academy of Arts and Sciences
2015 Elected member of the American Philosophical Society
 2018 Kavli Prize in Neuroscience (shared with Christine Petit and Robert Fettiplace)
 2020 Louisa Gross Horwitz Prize (shared with Christine Petit and Robert Fettiplace).

References 

Living people
Year of birth missing (living people)
Harvard Medical School alumni
Rockefeller University faculty
Members of the United States National Academy of Sciences
California Institute of Technology faculty
Kavli Prize laureates in Neuroscience